"So in Love with You" was the third and final UK single (two further singles being released in Germany) to be taken from Scottish band Texas' third studio album, Ricks Road. It was the biggest hit from the album and reached #28 on the UK Singles Chart in February 1994.

Track listing
 7" vinyl & cassette single (TEXAS 11 / TEXCM 11)
"So in Love with You" – 4:46
"So in Love with You" (Instrumental Version) – 4:46

(To date the 'Instrumental Version' has not appeared on CD.)

 CD1 (TEXCD 11 / 858 237-2)
"So in Love with You" – 4:46
"So Called Friend" – 3:44
"One Love" – 2:35
"You Owe It All to Me" – 3:38

(Tracks 2,3 and 4 are a BBC Radio 1 session recorded live at the Carnegie Deli in New York City.)

 CD2 'Live EP' (TEXCX 11 / 858 239-2)
"So in Love with You" (Live) – 4:29
"Why Believe in You" (Live) – 5:28
"Prayer For You" (Live) – 6:52
"Everyday Now" (Live) – 4:43

(All tracks recorded live at Glasgow Old Fruit Market on Sunday 7 November 1993. The foldout sleeve shows pictures from the show.)
(The CD sleeve incorrectly lists "Why Believe in You" as Why I Believe in You.)

Charts

References

1994 singles
Texas (band) songs
Songs written by Johnny McElhone
Songs written by Sharleen Spiteri
1993 songs
Phonogram Records singles